Samanabad Sports Arena, is a multifunctional sports arena in Samanabad, Pakistan. It is owned by the Lahore Parks and Horticulture Authority. It spans an area of more than five acres.

History
Samanabad Sports Arena was established in 1981 by the Lahore Development Authority (LDA). It was taken on by PHA in 1998 after the creation of PHA. The stadium was partially rehabilitated in 2013.

Facilities
Facilities provided by Samanabad Sports Arena (SSA) to registered members include:
 Swimming pool
 Badminton
 Gym
 Squash
 Table Tennis
 Taekwando
 Aerobics
 Snooker
 Parking for vehicles of Members

References

Sports venues in Pakistan